is an airport on Dōgo, one of the Oki Islands in the Shimane Prefecture of Japan. It is located approximately three kilometers south of the center of Okinoshima, the most populous town on these islands.

Oki Airport is a Class III facility with a  runway. It provides air service to Osaka International Airport ("Itami", ITM) and Izumo Airport (IZO).

History
Oki Airport was first opened in August 1965 with a 1200-meter runway for irregularly scheduled services to Yonago Airport. Irregularly scheduled services to Izumo Airport began in July 1966. The airport received its Class-3 certification from the Japanese government in July 1968, permitting regularly scheduled passenger services to those locations. Services to Osaka began from April 1975. From November 1978, the airport was closed to permit strengthening of its runway. The airport reopened in April 1979 with a 1500-meter runway. However, a new airport was opened in July 2006 at a site adjacent to the former airport, with a 2000-meter runway, permitting jet operations. The airport terminal building is located on the southeast side of the runway. Boarding bridges are not installed.

Airlines and destinations

References

External links

 Oki Airport guide from Japan Airlines
 

Airports in Japan
Transport in Shimane Prefecture
Buildings and structures in Shimane Prefecture